Martin Červenka (born 3 August 1992) is a Czech professional baseball catcher who plays for Eagles Praha of the Extraliga. He has played in Minor League Baseball for ten seasons and for the Czech Republic national baseball team in international competitions, such as the 2019 European Baseball Championship and 2023 World Baseball Classic.

Career

Cleveland Indians
Červenka played in Extraliga when he was 15 years old. He trained at the European Baseball Academy at age 16. He signed with the Cleveland Indians in January 2009, and participated in extended spring training in 2009 and 2010, while finishing high school. He made his professional debut in 2011 in for the Arizona Indians of the Rookie-level Arizona League, batting .164/.233/.218 in 55 at bats.

The next season for the Arizona League team, Červenka batted .240/.352/.280 in 75 at bats. In 2013, playing for two minor league teams he batted .185/.271/.221 in 195 at bats. In 2014, playing in Class A- he batted .181/.250/217 in 83 at bats. In 2015, playing in Class A he batted .184/.233/.247 in 174 at bats. In 2016, playing for two minor league teams he batted .272/.332/.383 in 342 at bats. In 2017, playing in Class A+ he batted .278/.343/.418 in 400 at bats.

Baltimore Orioles
After the 2017 season, Červenka became a free agent and signed with the San Francisco Giants. He was selected by the Orioles in the minor league phase of the Rule 5 draft. In 2018, playing in Class AA he batted .258/.317/.457 in 337 at bats, hitting a career-high 15 home runs (tied for 8th in the Eastern League) and 60 run batted in (RBIs). In 2019 he batted .233/.304/.324 in aggregate for three minor league teams, reaching Class AAA for the first time. He became a free agent on 2 November 2020.

New York Mets
On 22 March 2021, Červenka signed a minor league contract with the New York Mets organization. He played for the Syracuse Mets in the 2021 season. On 9 November 2021, Červenka became a free agent.

Eagles Praha
In 2022, Červenka signed with the Eagles Praha of Extraliga.

International career
Červenka has played for the Czech Republic national baseball team at the 2012 European Baseball Championship, 2013 World Baseball Classic Qualification, 2014 European Baseball Championship, 2015 USA Tour, 2017 World Baseball Classic Qualification, and 2016 European Baseball Championship. He played for the team at the Africa/Europe 2020 Olympic Qualification tournament, in Italy in September 2019.

In 2022, Červenka was selected to play the 2023 World Baseball Classic qualification. He played for the national team in the 2023 World Baseball Classic.

Personal life
Červenka's father, Filip, and older brother, Marek, also play baseball. Červenka completed an undergraduate degree and expected to complete his Master of Business Administration in 2018.

See also
Rule 5 draft results

References

External links

1992 births
Living people
Arizona League Indians players
Baseball catchers
Bowie Baysox players
Czech expatriate baseball players in the United States
Glendale Desert Dogs players
Lake County Captains players
Lynchburg Hillcats players
Norfolk Tides players
Mahoning Valley Scrappers players
Syracuse Mets players
Sportspeople from Prague
2016 European Baseball Championship players
2019 European Baseball Championship players
2023 World Baseball Classic players